This is a categorised list of places in Rhondda Cynon Taf County Borough, south Wales.

Administrative divisions

Electoral wards

A list of electoral wards in Rhondda Cynon Taf since 1995 (2022 where indicated):

22 = new ward as of May 2022
n22 = new ward name as of May 2022

Communities
This is a list of local government communities (since the creation of Rhondda Cynon Taf unless otherwise indicated):

See also
 Lists of places in Wales

References

Rhondda Cynon Taf (categorised)